is the pen name of  a member and the former chair of the Japanese Communist Party. He is a graduate of Tokyo University. He joined the Communist Party in 1947.

By around 1972, Fuwa was being placed in positions of higher authority over some other senior party members as part of the JCP's attempts at changing its image and courting younger voters, with the Asahi Shimbun remarking on Fuwa's "eloquency, gentle manner and good looks" in connection to the JCP's electoral strategy. Fuwa was one of the figures in the party who were instrumental in leading the charge to shift the JCP's public image from that of a violent revolutionary group to a reformist and democratic one.

He eventually become chairman of the JCP from 1982 to 1987; and he again held to position from 1989 to 2000. He was president of the Central Committee from 2000 to 2006.

He advocates scientific socialism and believes that socialism should be achieved through stages.

References

External links
On North Korean Question 
Asia, Africa and Latin America in the Present-day World
Breaking Japan's Diplomatic Stalemate
Three Missing Points in Arguments for Constitutional Revision
Marxism and the 21st Century World
85 Years of the Japanese Communist Party and the Present Stage of Development

1930 births
Living people
Japanese Communist Party politicians
Japanese communists
University of Tokyo alumni